Stupino is a rural locality (a selo) in Chernoyarsky District, Astrakhan Oblast, Russia. The population was 519 as of 2010. There are 20 streets.

Geography 
Stupino is located 46 km northwest of Chyorny Yar (the district's administrative centre) by road. Pody is the nearest rural locality.

References 

Rural localities in Chernoyarsky District